Castlelevington (or Castle Leavington) is a group of hamlets, former township and former civil parish.

The area is in the borough of Stockton-on-Tees, North Yorkshire, England. According to the 2001 census it had a population of 30. At the 2011 Census, it remained only minimal.

The parish originated as a chapelry within the parish of Kirklevington and it became recognised as a separate civil parish in 1866. It was part of the Stokesley Rural District from 1894 to 1974, when it became part of the borough of Stockton.

The area forms the eastern half of the present parish. It covers a number of farms: Red Hall, White Hall, Spell Close, Levington House, Woodcroft and The Mill although there is no settlement in the area known as Castle Levington. Red Hall was seat of the Meryton family, whose most famous son was George Meryton (d. 1624), chaplain to Queen Anne and Dean of Peterborough and York. In the far east of the parish is the motte that gives the area its name. The eastern border is the River Leven.

References

External links
Old map of parishes around Kirklevington

Borough of Stockton-on-Tees
Civil parishes in North Yorkshire